Rainer Michael Ratinac is a former squash player from Australia. He was one of the leading players on the North American hardball squash circuit in the 1970s.

Ratinac was the runner-up at the US Open squash championship in 1974.

After retiring Ratinac became a Baptist minister, working as a sports chaplain.

References

Australian male squash players
Year of birth missing (living people)
Living people
20th-century Australian Baptist ministers
21st-century Australian Baptist ministers